Chiki is a given name and nickname. Notable people associated with this name include the following:

Nickname
Chiki Meza, nickname of Jesús Meza (born 1986), Venezuelan footballer

Given name
Chiki Sampath (1920 – 1990) was a Trinidadian cricketer.
Chiki Sarkar, Indian book publisher

See also

Chik (name)
 Chika (Igbo given name)
 Chika (Japanese given name)
Chika (name)
Chikki Panday
Chiky Ardil
Chibi (disambiguation)
Chii (disambiguation)
Chikai (disambiguation)
Chili (disambiguation)
Chini (disambiguation)
Chiti (disambiguation)
Chixi (disambiguation)
Choki (disambiguation)